Doyle Kenneth Parrack (December 6, 1921 – September 5, 2008) was an American professional basketball player and coach.

Parrack was born in Cotton County, Oklahoma, and played basketball at Connors Jr. College and Oklahoma A&M University, where the Aggies under coach Henry Iba won an NCAA Championship in 1945. He coached at Shawnee (OK) High School for one year and compiled a 15–12 record. He then returned to the court and played one season of professional basketball for the Chicago Stags of the NBA. Parrack was hired as coach at Oklahoma City University in 1947 and transformed the program from a club team without a campus gymnasium into a national powerhouse. He eventually led the Chiefs to four consecutive NCAA tournament appearances.

In 1955 he accept the position as head coach of the University of Oklahoma. In 1959 he was named Conference Coach of the Year. In 1962 Parrack returned to his alma mater, where he worked with Coach Iba as an assistant until Iba retired in 1970. Two years later he was hired to build the Israeli national basketball team, and took his team to the playoffs in Germany that same year. In 1978 through 1980 Parrack served as head coach in the University of Oklahoma women's program.

After retiring as an active coach, Parrack served as a probation officer for the Oklahoma City Juvenile Bureau. He was inducted into the Oklahoma City University Sports Hall of Fame and the Oklahoma State University Athletics Hall of Honor and was recognized by Oklahoma City University when the clock tower at the Meinder's School of Business was named in his honor.

Parrack died on September 5, 2008, at his home in Perkins, Oklahoma, at age 86.

BAA career statistics

Regular season

Playoffs

Head coaching record

Men's college basketball

Women's college basketball

References

1921 births
2008 deaths
American men's basketball players
American women's basketball coaches
Basketball coaches from Oklahoma
Basketball players from Oklahoma
Chicago Stags players
College men's basketball head coaches in the United States
Oklahoma City Stars men's basketball coaches
Oklahoma Sooners men's basketball coaches
Oklahoma Sooners women's basketball coaches
Oklahoma State Cowboys basketball players
People from Cotton County, Oklahoma
People from Perkins, Oklahoma